"Last Breath" is a song performed by Swedish singer Liamoo. It participated in Melodifestivalen 2018 where it made it to the finals.

Charts

References

2018 singles
English-language Swedish songs
Melodifestivalen songs of 2018
Swedish pop songs
Song articles with missing songwriters
Songs written by Peter Bjørnskov